('round' in French) is a kind of script in which the heavy strokes are nearly upright, giving the characters when taken together a round look. It appeared in France at the end of the 16th century, growing out from a late local variant of Gothic cursive influenced by N. Italian Renaissance types in Rotunda, a bookish round Gothic style, as well as Civilité, also a late French variant of Gothic cursive.

While this style of writing fell out of popularity after the invention of a mass-produced pointed pen from steel in the early 19th century, in the 1870s Friedrich Soennecken reintroduced it again (this time with a steel broad-nibbed pen) in the modified form of his Rundschrift.

The classic French  where also very present in the work of 18th century type founder and calligrapher , which has been revived for the digital medium by way of the French 111 font.

See also

Asemic writing
Bastarda
Blackletter
Book hand
Calligraphy
Chancery hand
Court hand (also known as common law hand, Anglicana, cursiva antiquior, or charter hand)
Cursive
Hand (writing style)
Handwriting
History of writing
Italic script
Law hand
Palaeography
Penmanship
Rotunda (script)
Round hand
Secretary hand

Notes and references 

Writing
Latin-script calligraphy
Palaeography
Western calligraphy